Karl Heinz Kramer (21 December 1925 – 23 March 1965) was a German sports shooter. He competed in the trap shooting at the 1960 Summer Olympics.

Olympic Games
1960 Summer Olympics in Rome, competing for the United Team of Germany:
 Shooting – Men's trap – 22nd place (tie)

References

External links
 

1925 births
1965 deaths
German male sport shooters
Olympic shooters of the United Team of Germany
Shooters at the 1960 Summer Olympics
Sportspeople from Mecklenburg-Western Pomerania